Abdallah Mohamed Kamil (عبد الله محمد كامل) (born 1936, in Obock) is a Djiboutian politician. He served as Prime Minister of the country from 5 February 1978 to 2 October 1978.

Abdallah Mohamed Kamil holds a diploma from the French Sciences Po. He acted as Secrétaire général du gouvernement in 1974.
Prior to Djibouti's independence in 1977, Kamil held the posts President of the Government Council (29 July 1976–18 May 1977). He served as Minister of Foreign Affairs in the first post-independence government, and following the resignation of Prime Minister Ahmed Dini Ahmed, he was appointed as Prime Minister at the head of a new government on 5 February 1978, while remaining Minister of Foreign Affairs and also becoming Minister of Defense. President Hassan Gouled Aptidon dismissed his government on 21 September 1978 and subsequently appointed Barkat Gourad Hamadou to succeed him.

References

 Alwan (Daoud A.), Mibrathu (Yohanis) [2000], Historical Dictionary of Djibouti, Lanham and London, The Scarecrow Press, 200 p.
 Mohamed Aden, Sombloloho Djibouti - La Chute du président Ali Aref (1975-1976), L’Harmattan, Paris-Montréal, 1999, 224 p.

1936 births
Living people
Foreign Ministers of Djibouti
Prime Ministers of Djibouti
People's Rally for Progress politicians
People from Obock Region